Emma Hale Smith Bidamon (July 10, 1804 – April 30, 1879) was an American homesteader, the first wife of Joseph Smith, and a prominent leader in the early days of the Latter Day Saint movement, both during Smith's lifetime and afterward as a member of the Reorganized Church of Jesus Christ of Latter Day Saints (RLDS Church). In 1842, when the Ladies' Relief Society of Nauvoo was formed as a women's service organization, she was elected by its members as the organization's first president.

After the killing of Joseph Smith Emma remained in Nauvoo rather than following Brigham Young and the mormon pioneers to the Utah Territory. Emma was supportive of Smith's teachings throughout her life with the exception of plural marriage and remained loyal to her son Joseph Smith III in his leadership of the RLDS church.

Early life and first marriage, 1804–1829
Emma Hale was born on July 10, 1804, in Harmony Township, Susquehanna County, Pennsylvania, the seventh child of Isaac Hale and Elizabeth Lewis Hale. She was descended of primarily English ancestors, including seven passengers on the Mayflower. Beginning at age eight, she was involved in the local Methodist Episcopal Church in Harmony, reading the Bible and singing hymns. Emma first met her future husband, Joseph Smith, in 1825. Joseph lived near Palmyra, New York, but boarded with the Hales in Harmony while he was employed in a company of men hired by Josiah Stowell to unearth a "Dream Mine". Although the company was unsuccessful in finding the suspected mine, Joseph and Emma secretly met several times at a friend's house. When Joseph asked for Emma’s hand in marriage, Isaac and Elizabeth Hale refused to allow the marriage because they disapproved of Joseph's employment in treasure digging.  On January 17, 1827, Joseph and Emma left the Stowell house and traveled to the house of Zachariah Tarbill in South Bainbridge, New York, where they were married the following day. The couple moved to the home of Smith's parents on the edge of Manchester Township, near Palmyra.

On September 22, 1827, Joseph and Emma took a horse and carriage belonging to Joseph Knight, Sr., and went to a hill, now known as Hill Cumorah, where Joseph said he received a set of golden plates. Hiding the plates in his coat, he descended down the hill after many hours, and instead of taking them home, Joseph hid the plates. Shortly after the couple rode away from the hiding place, a small mob came over and searched the wagon for the golden plates. This was considered one of the miracles the couple experienced together.  The announcement of Joseph having the plates created a great deal of excitement in the area. In December 1827, with financial support from Martin Harris, the couple decided to move to Harmony, where they reconciled—to some extent—with Emma's parents. The Hales helped Emma and Joseph obtain a house and a small farm. Once they settled in, Joseph began work on the Book of Mormon, with Emma acting as a scribe. She became a physical witness of the plates, reporting that she felt them through a cloth, traced the pages through the cloth with her fingers, heard the metallic sound they made as she moved them, and felt their weight. She later wrote in an interview with her son, Joseph Smith III: "In writing for your father I frequently wrote day after day, often sitting at the table close by him, he sitting with his face buried in his hat, with the stone in it, and dictating hour after hour with nothing between us." In Harmony on June 15, 1828, Emma gave birth to her first child—a son named Alvin—who lived only a few hours.

In May 1829, Emma and Joseph left Harmony and went to live with David Whitmer in Fayette, New York. While travelling there, they saw an elderly man walking alongside the road. After offering him a ride, the man declined, saying that he was headed to Cumorah, and then disappeared suddenly. Joseph identified the man as the angel Moroni.
Joseph finished work on the Book of Mormon while living in Fayette; it was published in March 1830.

"Elect lady" and the early church, 1830–1839

On April 6, 1830, Joseph and five other men established the Church of Christ.

Emma was baptized by Oliver Cowdery on June 28, 1830, in Colesville, New York, where an early branch of the church was established. During the next weeks, Joseph was arrested, tried, and exonerated in South Bainbridge for "glass looking" based on the state's vagrancy law. In July 1830, Joseph received a revelation, now known as Doctrine and Covenants section 25, that highlighted Emma Smith as "an elect lady". The revelation also says that Emma would "be ordained under [Joseph's] hand to expound scriptures, and to exhort the church", and authorizes Emma to "make a selection of sacred Hymns" for the church.

Joseph and Emma returned to Harmony for a time, but relations with Emma's parents broke down, and the couple went back to staying in the homes of members of the growing church. They lived first with the Whitmers in Fayette, then with Newel K. Whitney and his family in Kirtland, Ohio, and then in a cabin on a farm owned by Isaac Morley. It was here on April 30, 1831, that Emma gave birth to premature twins, Thaddeus and Louisa; both babies died hours later. That same day, Julia Clapp Murdock died giving birth to twins, Joseph and Julia. When the twins were nine days old, their father, John, gave the infants to the Smiths to raise as their own. On September 2, 1831, the Smiths moved into John Johnson's home in Hiram, Ohio. The infant Joseph died of exposure or pneumonia in late March 1832, after a door was left open during a mob attack on Smith.

On November 6, 1832, Emma gave birth to Joseph Smith III in the upper room of Whitney's store in Kirtland. Young Joseph (as he became known) was the first of her natural children to live to adulthood. A second son, Frederick Granger Williams Smith (named after Frederick G. Williams, a counselor in the church's First Presidency), followed on June 29, 1836. As the Kirtland Temple was being constructed, Emma spearheaded an effort to house and clothe the construction workers.

While in Kirtland, Emma's feelings about temperance and the use of tobacco reportedly influenced her husband's decision to pray about dietary questions. These prayers resulted in the "Word of Wisdom". Also in Kirtland, Emma's first selection of hymns was published as a hymnal for the church's use. During the Panic of 1837, the Kirtland Safety Society, the banking venture that Joseph and other church leaders had set up to provide financing for the growing membership, collapsed, as did many financial institutions in the United States at that time. Emma herself held stock in the Society. The bank's demise led to serious problems for the church and the Smith family.  Joseph received revelation from God to leave Kirtland for the safety of his family, and on January 12, 1838, Joseph left for Missouri.  Many faithful saints soon followed.

Emma and her family followed and made a new home on the frontier in the Latter Day Saint settlement of Far West, Missouri, where Emma gave birth on June 2, 1838, to Alexander Hale Smith. Events of the 1838 Mormon War soon escalated, resulting in Joseph's surrender and imprisonment by Missouri officials. Emma and her family were forced to leave the state, along with most other church members. She crossed the Mississippi River, which had frozen over in February 1839. Of these times, she later wrote:

Early years in Nauvoo, 1839–1844
Emma and her family lived with friendly non-Mormons John and Sarah Cleveland in Quincy, Illinois, until Joseph escaped custody in Missouri. The family moved to a new Latter Day Saint settlement in Illinois which Joseph named "Nauvoo". On May 10, 1839, they moved into a two-story log house in Nauvoo that they called the "Homestead". On June 13, 1840, Emma gave birth to a son, Don Carlos, named after his uncle Don Carlos Smith, Joseph's brother. Both Don Carlos Smiths would die the next year. The Smiths lived in the homestead until 1843, when a much larger house, known as the "Mansion House" was built across the street. A wing (no longer extant) was added to this house, which Emma operated as a hotel. She often took in young girls in need of work, giving them jobs as maids.

On March 17, 1842, the Ladies' Relief Society of Nauvoo was formally organized as the women's auxiliary to the church. Emma became its founding president, with Sarah M. Cleveland and Elizabeth Ann Whitney as her counselors. She had persuaded John Taylor and Joseph Smith to call the organization the "Relief Society" instead of the "Benevolent Society". The Latter-Day Saint Biographical Encyclopedia records that Emma Smith "filled [the position] with marked distinction as long as the society continued to hold meetings in that city [Nauvoo]". She saw upholding morality as the primary purpose of the Relief Society. As "protecting the morals of the community" became her mission, Smith supported the public confession of sins; on this subject, Smith called the women of Nauvoo to repentance with "all the frankness of a Methodist exhorter." She served as president of the Relief Society until 1844. According to the minutes of the founding meeting, the organization was formed to "provoke the brethren to good works in looking to the wants of the poor, [search] after objects of charity [and] to assist by correcting the virtues of the female community". Shortly before this, Joseph had initiated the Anointed Quorum—a prayer circle of important church members that included Emma. As she had in Kirtland, Emma Smith lead "the work of boarding and clothing the men engaged in building [the Nauvoo temple]". She also traveled with a committee to Quincy, Illinois, to present Illinois governor Thomas Carlin "a memorial ... in behalf of her people" after the Latter Day Saints had experienced persecution in the state.

Rumors concerning polygamy and other practices surfaced by 1842. Emma publicly condemned polygamy and denied any involvement by her husband. Emma authorized and was the main signatory of a petition in summer 1842 with a thousand female signatures, denying Joseph Smith was connected with polygamy. As president of the Ladies' Relief Society, she authorized the publishing of a certificate in October 1842 denouncing polygamy and denying her husband as its creator or participant. In March 1844, Emma published: 

In June 1844, the press of the Nauvoo Expositor, a newspaper published by disaffected former church members, was destroyed by the town marshal on orders from the town council (of which Joseph was a member). This set into motion the events that ultimately led to Joseph's arrest and incarceration in the jail in Carthage, Illinois. A mob of about 200 armed men stormed the jail in the late afternoon of June 27, 1844, and both Joseph and his brother Hyrum were killed.

Later years in Nauvoo, 1844–1879

Upon Joseph's death, Emma was left a pregnant widow. On November 17, 1844, she gave birth to David Hyrum Smith, the last child that she and Joseph had together. In addition to being church president, Joseph had been trustee-in-trust for the church. As a result, his estate was entirely wrapped up with the finances of the church. Joseph had also been in debt when he died, leaving the responsibility to pay it on Emma Smith's shoulders. Untangling the church's debts and property from Emma's personal debts and property proved to be a long and complicated process for Emma and her family.

Debates about who should be Joseph's successor as the leader of the church also involved Emma. Emma wanted William Marks, president of the church's central stake, to assume the church presidency, but Marks favored Sidney Rigdon for the role. After a meeting on August 8, a congregation of the church voted that the Quorum of the Twelve Apostles should lead the church. Brigham Young, president of the quorum, then became the de facto president of the church in Nauvoo.

Relations between Young and Emma steadily deteriorated. Some of Emma's friends, as well as many members of the Smith family, alienated themselves from Young's followers. Conflicts between church members and neighbors also continued to escalate, and eventually Young made the decision to relocate the church to the Salt Lake Valley. When he and the majority of the Latter Day Saints of Nauvoo abandoned the city in early 1846, Emma and her children remained behind in the emptied town.

Nearly two years later, a close friend and non-Mormon, Major Lewis C. Bidamon, proposed marriage and became Emma's second husband on December 23, 1847. A Methodist minister performed the ceremony. Bidamon moved into the Mansion House and became stepfather to Emma's children. She and Bidamon had no children of their own. Emma and Bidamon attempted to operate a store and to continue using their large house as a hotel, but Nauvoo had too few residents and visitors to make either venture very profitable. Emma and her family remained rich in real estate but poor in capital.

Unlike other members of the Smith family who had at times favored the claims of James J. Strang or William Smith, Emma and her children continued to live in Nauvoo as unaffiliated Latter Day Saints. Many Latter Day Saints believed that her eldest son, Joseph Smith III, would one day be called to hold the same position that his father had held. When he reported receiving a calling from God to take his father's place as head of a "New Organization" of the Latter Day Saint church, she supported his decision. Both she and Joseph III traveled to a conference at Amboy, Illinois. On April 6, 1860, Joseph was sustained as president of the Church of Jesus Christ of Latter Day Saints, which prefaced "Reorganized" to its name in 1872 and in 2001 became known as the Community of Christ. Emma became a member of the RLDS Church without rebaptism, as her original 1830 baptism was still considered valid.

Emma and Joseph III returned to Nauvoo after the conference and he led the church from there until moving to Plano, Illinois, in 1866. Joseph III called upon his mother to help prepare a hymnal for the reorganization, just as she had for the early church.

Smith and Bidamon bought and renovated a portion of the unfinished Nauvoo House in 1869. A few visitors from Brigham Young's faction of the Latter-day Saints came from Utah Territory to visit Smith at this house. Emma died peacefully in the Nauvoo House on April 30, 1879, at the age of 74. Her funeral was held May 2, 1879, in Nauvoo with RLDS Church minister Mark Hill Forscutt preaching the sermon.

Hymns and hymnals

Alongside W. W. Phelps, Emma Smith compiled a Latter Day Saint hymnal, published in 1835. It was titled A Collection of Sacred Hymns, for the Church of the Latter Day Saints and contained 90 hymn texts but no music. Forty-eight were written by Latter Day Saints, and the remaining forty-two were not. The texts borrowed from Protestant groups were often changed slightly to reinforce the theology of the early church. For example, Hymn 15 changed Isaac Watts's Joy to the World from a song about Christmas to a song about the return of Christ (see Joy to the World (Phelps)). Many of these changes and a large number of the original songs included in the hymnal are attributed to W. W. Phelps.

Emma also compiled a second hymnal by the same title, which was published in Nauvoo, Illinois, in 1841. This contained 304 hymn texts.

When her son Joseph III became president of the RLDS Church, she was again asked to compile a hymnal. Latter Day Saints' Selection of Hymns was published in 1861.

Polygamy

In their biography Mormon Enigma, Linda King Newell and Valeen Tippetts Avery report that Emma witnessed several marriages of Joseph Smith to plural wives. However, throughout her lifetime Emma publicly denied her husband's involvement in the practice of polygamy and denied on her deathbed that the practice had ever occurred. Emma stated, 

Emma Smith stated that the first time she became aware of a polygamy revelation being attributed to Joseph Smith was when she read about it in 1853 in Orson Pratt's booklet The Seer. Many of the Latter Day Saints who joined the RLDS Church in the midwestern United States had broken with Brigham Young and/or James Strang because of opposition to polygamy. Emma's continuing public denial of the practice seemed to lend strength to their cause, and opposition to polygamy became a tenet of the RLDS Church. Over the years, many RLDS Church historians have continued to state that the practice had originated with Brigham Young.

Notes

References

Citations

Other sources

 Linda King Newell and Valeen Tippetts Avery, Mormon Enigma: Emma Hale Smith (New York: Doubleday, 1984). . 2nd edition. rev., Urbana, Illinois: University of Illinois Press, 1994.
 Michael Hicks, Mormonism and Music: A History, (Chicago: University of Illinois Press, 1989; [Paperback Ed., 2003]).
 Dan Vogel, Early Mormon Documents, Vol. 4, (Salt Lake City: Signature Books, 2002).
 Roger D. Launius, Joseph Smith III: Pragmatic Prophet, (Urbana: University of Illinois Press, 1988).
 Richard Lyman Bushman, Joseph Smith: Rough Stone Rolling, (New York:  Knopf, 2005)

External links
 

Mormon enigma: Emma Hale Smith, prophet's wife, "elect lady," polygamy's foe (typewritten book draft), L. Tom Perry Special Collections, Harold B. Lee Library, Brigham Young University
Emma Hale Smith certificate, L. Tom Perry Special Collections, Harold B. Lee Library, Brigham Young University
Smith family legal instruments, L. Tom Perry Special Collections, Harold B. Lee Library, Brigham Young University
Testimony regarding Emma Smith Bidamon, Nauvoo, Illinois, L. Tom Perry Special Collections, Harold B. Lee Library, Brigham Young University

! colspan="3" style="border-top: 5px solid #FABE60;" |Church of Jesus Christ of Latter Day Saints titles

1804 births
1879 deaths
American Latter Day Saint hymnwriters
American Latter Day Saint leaders
American members of the Community of Christ
American people of English descent
Angelic visionaries
Book of Mormon witnesses
Burials at the Smith Family Cemetery
Converts to Mormonism
Doctrine and Covenants people
General Presidents of the Relief Society
Latter Day Saints from Illinois
Latter Day Saints from Ohio
Latter Day Saints from Pennsylvania
Leaders in the Church of Christ (Latter Day Saints)
People from Nauvoo, Illinois
People from Palmyra, New York
Religious leaders from Pennsylvania
Smith family (Latter Day Saints)
Wives of Joseph Smith
Harold B. Lee Library-related 19th century articles